Brownschidle is a surname. Notable people with the surname include:

Jack Brownschidle (born 1955), American ice hockey player, brother of Jeff
Jeff Brownschidle (1959–1996), American ice hockey player